is a Japanese football player.

Club statistics
Updated to 20 February 2017.

References

External links

Profile at Veertien Mie
J. League (#25)

1989 births
Living people
Chuo University alumni
People from Komono
Association football people from Mie Prefecture
Japanese footballers
J2 League players
J3 League players
Japan Football League players
Ventforet Kofu players
Fujieda MYFC players
Gainare Tottori players
Vonds Ichihara players
Veertien Mie players
Association football defenders